Ibrahim "Ibro" Biogradlić (8 March 1931 – 20 February 2015) was a Bosnian-Herzegovinian footballer who played at 1956 Summer Olympics for Yugoslavia, winning a silver medal.

Club career
He was capped 646 times for FK Sarajevo, and is the club's record holder with the most appearances.

International career
He made his debut for Yugoslavia in a December 1956 European Championship qualification match against India, it remained his sole international appearance.

Death
Biogradlić died on 20 February 2015 following a long illness.  He was 83.

References

External links

 facebook page

1931 births
2015 deaths
Footballers from Sarajevo
Association football defenders
Yugoslav footballers
Yugoslavia international footballers
Olympic footballers of Yugoslavia
Olympic silver medalists for Yugoslavia
Footballers at the 1956 Summer Olympics
Olympic medalists in football
Medalists at the 1956 Summer Olympics
FK Sarajevo players
Yugoslav First League players
Bosnia and Herzegovina football managers
Bargh Shiraz F.C. managers
FK Jedinstvo Brčko managers
Bosnia and Herzegovina expatriate football managers
Expatriate football managers in Iran
Bosnia and Herzegovina expatriate sportspeople in Iran